Atome may refer to:
Atomè, Benin
Atôme, Angola
The , a two-piece swimsuit invented in 1932 by Jacques Heim

See also
Atoma (disambiguation)
Tafi Atome Monkey Sanctuary, Ghana